Joílson Rodrigues da Silva, referred to simply as Joílson (born December 8, 1976), is a former Brazilian football midfielder. He was born in Arataca, near Itabuna.

Career
Defending Atlético Paranaense, he played five Campeonato Brasileiro Série A games in 1997, and scored one goal. In the same year, he played two Copa do Brasil games for Atlético Paranaense. In 1999, he played one Copa do Brasil game for Gama.

References

External links
 
 

1976 births
Living people
Brazilian footballers
Expatriate footballers in Iran
Club Athletico Paranaense players
Iraty Sport Club players
Botafogo Futebol Clube (SP) players
Sociedade Esportiva do Gama players
CR Vasco da Gama players
Seongnam FC players
K League 1 players
Clube do Remo players
Oeste Futebol Clube players
Esporte Clube Novo Hamburgo players
Grêmio Esportivo Brasil players
Mirassol Futebol Clube players
Zob Ahan Esfahan F.C. players
Esteghlal F.C. players
Chonburi F.C. players
Brazilian expatriate footballers
Expatriate footballers in South Korea
Brazilian expatriate sportspeople in South Korea
Association football midfielders